The GiMA Best Duet is given by Global Indian Music Academy as a part of its annual Global Indian Music Academy Awards.

List of winners

 2014 Rekha Bhardwaj & Tochi Raina for "Kabira" – Yeh Jawaani Hai Deewani
 Mili Nair & Amit Trivedi for "Meethi Boliyaan" – Kai Po Che!
 Shreya Ghoshal & Javed Bashir for "O Rangrezz" – Bhaag Milkha Bhaag
 Palak Muchhal & Arijit Singh for "Chahun Main Ya Naa" – Aashiqui 2
 Shalmali Kholgade & Vishal Dadlani for "Balam Pichakari" – Yeh Jawaani Hai Deewaani

 2015 Arijit Singh & Shreya Ghoshal for "Samjhawan" – Humpty Sharma Ki Dulhania
 Shreya Ghoshal & Arijit Singh for "Manwa Laage" – Happy New Year
 Chinmayi & Shekhar Ravjiani for "Zehnaseeb" – Hasee Toh Phasee
 Neeti Mohan & Benny Dayal for "Bang Bang" – Bang Bang!
 Sunidhi Chauhan & Javed Ali for "Daawat-e-Ishq" – Daawat-e-Ishq

 2016 Arijit Singh & Tulsi Kumar for "Soch Na Sake" – Airlift
 Shreya Ghoshal & Vaishali Mhade for "Pinga" – Bajirao Mastani
 Shreya Ghoshal & Sonu Nigam for "Tere Bin" – Wazir
 Divya Kumar & Priya Saraiya for "Sunn Saathiya" – ABCD 2
 Armaan Malik & Neeti Mohan for "Tumhe Apna Banane Ka" – Hate Story 3
 Swati Sharma & Brijesh Sandilya for "Banno Tera Swagger" – Tanu Weds Manu Returns

See also
 Bollywood
 Cinema of India

References

Global Indian Music Academy Awards